In mathematics, an integer-valued function is a function whose values are integers.  In other words, it is a function that assigns an integer to each member of its domain.

The floor and ceiling functions are examples of integer-valued functions of a real variable, but on real numbers and, generally, on (non-disconnected) topological spaces integer-valued functions are not especially useful. Any such function on a connected space either has discontinuities or is constant. On the other hand, on discrete and other totally disconnected spaces integer-valued functions have roughly the same importance as real-valued functions have on non-discrete spaces.

Any function with natural, or non-negative integer values is a partial case of an integer-valued function.

Examples 
Integer-valued functions defined on the domain of all real numbers include the floor and ceiling functions, the Dirichlet function, the sign function and the Heaviside step function (except possibly at 0).

Integer-valued functions defined on the domain of non-negative real numbers include the integer square root function and the prime-counting function.

Algebraic properties 
On an arbitrary set , integer-valued functions form a ring with pointwise operations of addition and multiplication, and also an algebra over the ring  of integers. Since the latter is an ordered ring, the functions form a partially ordered ring:

Uses

Graph theory and algebra 
Integer-valued functions are ubiquitous in graph theory. They also have similar uses in geometric group theory, where length function represents the concept of norm, and word metric represents the concept of metric.

Integer-valued polynomials are important in ring theory.

Mathematical logic and computability theory 
Gödel numbering, defined on well-formed formulae of some formal language, is a natural-valued function.

Computability theory is essentially based on natural numbers and natural (or integer) functions on them.

Number theory 
In number theory, many arithmetic functions are integer-valued.

Computer science 
In computer programming, many functions return values of integer type due to simplicity of implementation.

See also 

 Integer-valued polynomial
 Semi-continuity
 Rank (disambiguation)#Mathematics
 Grade (disambiguation)#In mathematics

Types of functions